is a 1987 platform arcade game developed and released by Namco in Japan and other parts of Asia. The player controls a young boy named Tarosuke as he must make his way through Jigoku, the Japanese concept of Hell, to reach Buddha, who will determine his fate. Tarosuke can fire small "ki" bullets at enemies to defeat them; he can also charge them to increase their power. Enemies will drop money when defeated, which can be used to purchase weapons and other items in stores. Two versions of the arcade original were released: a Japanese version and an English version which was released in other Asian countries outside Japan. The Arcade Archives release includes both versions.

Gameplay

In Yokai Dochuki, the player controls Tarosuke, a boy who was banished to "jigoku" for causing mischief in the world of the living. Tarosuke must venture through the monster-infested world of jigoku to reach Yama, the Buddhist deity that judges the dead, who determines his final fate. The game is divided into five levels, each taking place in specific regions of jigoku, such as "Jigoku Iriguchi" (The Gateway to Hell) and "Yuukai" (The Ghost Sea). Tarosuke must reach the end of these levels while defeating enemies and jumping onto platforms. He can defeat enemies by shooting small "ki" bullets; these can be charged to increase their power by holding down on the joystick or directional pad. Enemies drop bags of money when killed which is used to purchase useful items at stores. Tarosuke has a life bar that depletes when he is inflicted with damage; the game ends when the meter is empty.

The first four stages conclude in a boss fight with an oni that guards the entrance to the next stage. At the beginning of these, Tarosuke kneels at a shrine and summons a spirit named Monmotaro to defeat the oni. The player controls Monmotaro in these fights, being able to fly around and shoot powerful energy pellets. The game increases in difficulty as Tarosuke progresses, with some levels requiring him to find three secret items in order to unlock the way to the next area and search for hidden pathways. The amount of money collected and enemies killed in the final level determines which of five endings the player receives, with the best showing Tarosuke traveling to heaven, and the worst ending showing Tarosuke sent back to Hell. The Family Computer version of the game adds a "pious" meter, which is filled when Tarosuke performs good deeds such as complete specific objectives in some levels. The pious meter also helps determine the ending received at the end of the game.

Release
The game was later ported to the PC Engine, and Family Computer consoles with several additions and different level design; the PC Engine version and the arcade version were both later re-released for the Japanese Virtual Console. The game was also followed by a Japan-only spin-off in 1990 named Kyūkai Dōchūki, which is a "yakyū" (baseball) video game that plays similar to the entirety of Namco's own World Stadium series.

Tarosuke also appears as a playable character in the Japan-only role-playing PlayStation 2 game Namco X Capcom, where he is teamed up with Taira no Kagekiyo from Genpei Tōma Den. He also makes a cameo appearance in Project X Zone 2 for the Nintendo 3DS.

Reception

Game Machine reported that Yokai Dokuchi was the most-popular arcade game in the month of April 1987. It went on to be the fifth highest-grossing table arcade game of 1987 in Japan.

Notes

References

External links
Official Namco Virtual Console website 
Official Wii U Virtual Console website 

1987 video games
Arcade video games
Bandai Namco Entertainment franchises
Japan-exclusive video games
Namco arcade games
Now Production games
Nintendo Entertainment System games
TurboGrafx-16 games
Video games developed in Japan
Virtual Console games
Virtual Console games for Wii U
Single-player video games